Triglachromis otostigma is a species of cichlid endemic to Lake Tanganyika in Africa where it prefers waters with a muddy substrate.  This species can reach a length of  TL.  It can also be found in the aquarium trade. It is currently the only known member of its genus.

References

External links
 Photograph

Limnochromini
Taxa named by Max Poll
Taxa named by Thys van den Audenaerde
Taxa named by Charles Tate Regan
Fish described in 1920
Taxonomy articles created by Polbot